Bagbaguin may refer to:

Barangay Bagbaguin, Santa Maria, Bulacan, Philippines
 Barangay Bagbaguin in Valenzuela City, Metro Manila, Philippines